Geoffrey William Arrand (born 24 July 1944) was archdeacon of Suffolk from 1994 to 2009.

Arrand was educated at King's College London and ordained in 1968. After curacies in Washington and South Ormsby he was Vicar of Great Grimsby from 1973 to 1979; Team Rector of Halesworth from 1979 to 1985; Dean of Bocking from 1985 to 1994; and Rural Dean of Hadleigh from 1986 to 1994.

References

1944 births
Living people
Alumni of King's College London
Archdeacons of Suffolk